Stenen is a village in the Canadian province of Saskatchewan within the Rural Municipality of Clayton No. 333 and Census Division No. 9.

History 
Stenen incorporated as a village on August 14, 1912.

Demographics 

Attractions 
The Stone
 Rawhides Bistro & Saloon Inc. http://rawhides.ca

Notable people
Wilson Parasiuk
Peter Beskowiney

See also 
 List of communities in Saskatchewan
 Villages of Saskatchewan

Footnotes

External links

Villages in Saskatchewan
Clayton No. 333, Saskatchewan
Division No. 9, Saskatchewan